Robert McDonnell "Bob" Lang (October 1, 1892 – September 19, 1966) was a college football player.

Early years
Before attending Tech Lang went to the old South Georgia College in McRae.

Georgia Tech
Lang was a prominent guard for John Heisman's Georgia Tech Golden Tornado of the Georgia Institute of Technology, a member of its "All-Era" team under Heisman.

1915
The school's yearbook the Blue Print of 1915 describes Lang as "one of the biggest men on the varsity, not only in stature but in spirit as well."

1916
Lang was a starter for the 1916 Georgia Tech team which, as one writer wrote, "seemed to personify Heisman." That team defeated Cumberland 222 to 0. He anchored the line along with Walker Carpenter and Pup Phillips.

References

American football guards
Georgia Tech Yellow Jackets football players
All-Southern college football players
1892 births
1966 deaths
People from Camden County, Georgia
Players of American football from Atlanta